The Anti-fascist Assembly for the National Liberation of Macedonia (Antifašističko sobranie za narodno osloboduvanje na Makedonija; Serbo-Croatian: Antifašističko sobranje narodnog oslobođenja Makedonije; abbr. ASNOM) was the supreme legislative and executive people's representative body of the communist Macedonian state from August 1944 until the end of World War II. The body was set up by the Macedonian Partisans during the final stages of the World War II in Yugoslav Macedonia. That occurred clandestinely in August 1944, in the Bulgarian occupation zone of Yugoslavia. Simultaneously another state was declared by pro-Nazi Germany Macedonian right-wing nationalists.

History

First session (under occupation)

Significance
The first plenary session of ASNOM was convened underground on the symbolic date of August 2 (Ilinden uprising day) 1944 in the St. Prohor Pčinjski Monastery, now in Serbia. The Monastery and surrounding area, which are part of the region of Macedonia, were transferred from SR Macedonia to SR Serbia in 1947. The most important assembly decisions are the proclamation of a Macedonian nation-state of ethnic Macedonians and Macedonian as the official language of the Macedonian state. The citizens of Macedonia, regardless of their ethnic affiliation, would be guaranteed all civil rights, as well as the right to their mother tongue and confession of faith.

The first session was opened with the anthem of the Internal Macedonian Revolutionary Organization (IMRO) "Rise up dayspring of the freedom", which became also the anthem of the newly proclaimed republic. However, in the next year it was banned by the authorities as bulgarophile sentiment. The Assembly issued a Manifesto which described the situation in the Vardar Banovina under the old Yugoslavia as that of a colony. The manifesto issued by ASNOM's first session also explicitly stated its hope for the "unification of the whole Macedonian people", i.e., in the whole of the geographical region of Macedonia.

Dispute
The presiding committee of ASNOM was dominated by elements that were not known for their pro-Yugoslav sentiments. Panko Brashnarov (a former member of IMRO) chaired (as the oldest member) the inaugural meeting and Metodija Andonov-Čento was elected president. Both wanted greater independence for the future republic. They saw joining Yugoslavia as a form of second Serbian dominance over Macedonia and preferred membership in a Balkan Federation or else complete independence. Čento and partly Brashnarov clashed with Svetozar Vukmanović-Tempo, Josip Broz Tito’s envoy to Macedonia. One of the contributors in the Assembly was Kiro Gligorov, later the first President of the Republic of Macedonia. According to some researchers the first session was manipulated by the pro-Yugoslav representatives, and the presence of more than 50% of the elected delegates is questionable.

Developments
In early September, Nazi Germany briefly sought to establish a puppet state called independent Macedonia. However, the state was de facto not established due to the lack of any military support. Despite this, it was declared by Macedonian right nationalists on 8 September. After Bulgaria switched sides in the war on September 9, the Bulgarian 5th. The army stationed in Macedonia, moved back to the old borders of Bulgaria. In early October the newly formed Bulgarian People's Army together with the Red Army reentered occupied Yugoslavia. The Germans were driven off from Vardar Macedonia in late November by the Bulgarian Army with the help of the Macedonian Partisans.

Second session
The ASNOM became officially operational in December, shortly after the German retreat. During this session Lazar Koliševski, the new leader of the Communist Party of Macedonia, was declared the first deputy of Čento in the ASNOM presidency during the second session of this assembly on 28–31 December. In September 1944, Koliševski, who was a prisoner, was freed by the new Bulgarian pro-communist government. At the same session a decision was taken a tribunal to be created, that will judge "the collaborators of the occupiers who have panned the Macedonian name and the Macedonian national honor".

Third session
On the third session held in April 1945, the body transformed itself into a republican Parliament. Čento was replaced by Kolishevski, who started fully implementing the pro-Yugoslav line. Kolisevski strongly supported the promotion of a distinct ethnic Macedonian identity and language in SR Macedonia. ASNOM formed a committee to standardize Macedonian and its alphabet. In December 1944 ASNOM rejected the first committee's recommendations as pro-Bulgarian. It formed a second committee, whose recommendations were accepted in April 1945. The (second) committees' recommendations were strongly influenced by the Serbian Cyrillic alphabet.

Controversy
From the start of the new Yugoslavia, accusations surfaced that new authorities in Macedonia were involved in retribution against people who did not support the formation of the new Yugoslav Macedonian republic. The numbers of dead "counter-revolutionaries" and "collaborators" due to organized killings during the Bloody Christmas and afterwards, however is unclear. At the end of 1944, the law for the protection of the Macedonian national honour was passed by SR Macedonia's government, for which the Presidium of ASNOM created a special court to implement it, persecuting Bulgarian individuals. Besides, many people went throughout the labor camp of Goli Otok in the middle 1940s. This chapter of Macedonia's history was a taboo subject for conversation in the SFRY until the late 1980s, and as a result, decades of official silence created a reaction in the form of numerous data manipulations for nationalist, communist propaganda purposes. In the last years the number of the victims was put forward to 50 000, including those killed, imprisoned, deported, sent to forced labor, tortured, etc. At that time, the ASNOM's first leaders Čento, Pavel Shatev and Brashnarov were purged from their positions, then isolated, arrested and imprisoned on fabricated charges, as foreign agents, having pro-Bulgarian leanings, demanding greater independence, collaborating with the Cominform, forming of conspirative political groups, demanding greater democracy and the like.

Gallery

See also
 AVNOJ
 Sobranie
 Military history of the Republic of Macedonia
 Independent State of Macedonia

References

Yugoslav Macedonia in World War II
Anti-fascism in Yugoslavia
Communism in North Macedonia
Macedonia
Political history of North Macedonia
Socialist Republic of Macedonia
1944 establishments in the Socialist Republic of Macedonia
1945 disestablishments in Yugoslavia